Hydrorion (meaning 'water hunter') is a genus of plesiosaur from the Toarcian Age of the Lower Jurassic. It is only known from multiple specimens, all discovered in the Posidonia Shale of southwestern Germany. The only species of Hydrorion is H. brachypterygius, which was originally described as a species of Plesiosaurus and then Microcleidus.

See also
 Timeline of plesiosaur research

References

Jurassic plesiosaurs of Europe
Fossils of Germany
Sauropterygian genera